Passione or La Passione may refer to:

Film, theatre and television
 La Passione (1996 film), a 1996 film and soundtrack album by Chris Rea
 Passione (2010 film), a 2010 film about the music of Naples directed by John Turturro
 Passione, a mafia group from the manga and anime of the same name, JoJo's Bizarre Adventure: Golden Wind
 La Passione (2010 film), a 2010 Italian comedy film directed by Carlo Mazzacurati
 Passione (1953 film), a 1953 Italian film
 Passione (telenovela), a 2010 Brazilian telenovela
 Passione (play), 1980 play by Albert Innaurato

Music

Compositions
"Symphony No. 49 (Haydn) La passione, the 49th symphony by Joseph Haydn
La Passione di Gesù Cristo libretto by Metastasio which was repeatedly set, including:
La Passione (Salieri) by  Salieri 
La Passione (Mayr)  by Simon Mayr

Albums
Passione, album by Luciano Pavarotti
 "Passione", album by Zizi Possi 1998 
Passione (Paul Potts album), 2009 album
Passione (Andrea Bocelli album), 2013 album

Songs
Passione (song), 1934 song in the Canzone Napoletana genre by Libero Bovio, Ernesto Tagliaferri, Nicola Valente

Other uses
Passione (company), a Japanese animation studio

See also
Passion (disambiguation)